Johann André Forfang (born 4 July 1995) is a Norwegian ski jumper and 2018 team Olympic champion.

Career
Like his older brother Daniel Forfang he represents the club Tromsø SK. Forfang made his World Cup debut in December 2014. He won team gold medal FIS Ski Flying World Championships 2016 with his teammates in Tauplitz/Bad Mitterndorf. His first individual world cup victory was in Titisee-Neustadt on 12 March 2016. In 2018 he won the last worldccup before the Olympic Games in Willingen. At the 2018 Olympic Games he gained a silver medal in normal hill individual and he is Olympic Champion 2018 with the Norway skijumping team (Andreas Stjernen, Daniel-André Tande, Robert Johansson).
On 1 December 2018 he won the world cup in Tagil (Russia).

FIS World Nordic Ski Championships

World Cup

Standings

Wins

Individual starts (177)

References

External links
 
 

1995 births
Living people
Sportspeople from Tromsø
Norwegian male ski jumpers
FIS Nordic World Ski Championships medalists in ski jumping
Olympic ski jumpers of Norway
Ski jumpers at the 2018 Winter Olympics
Medalists at the 2018 Winter Olympics
Olympic gold medalists for Norway
Olympic silver medalists for Norway
Olympic medalists in ski jumping
21st-century Norwegian people